The Tamer Institute for Community Education is a non-profit non-governmental  educational organization working in Palestine. It was established in 1989 in response to Palestinian needs during the first intifada.

Tamer works primarily with and for children and young people, providing safe, friendly learning environments and materials. Tamer runs a publishing unit, publish a newsletter, hold courses for librarians, arranges workshops, donate books to local libraries and arranges an annual reading - and writing campaign.

Astrid Lindgren Memorial Award

In 2009, the Tamer Institute won the biggest prize in children's literature (five million SEK, approximately 460,000 EUR), the Astrid Lindgren Memorial Award from the Swedish Arts Council, recognising its "long-term sustainable work" as a promoter of reading. It is one of two institutions to win the award (2003 to 2012).

See also

References

External links
 

Education in the State of Palestine
Educational organizations based in the State of Palestine
Astrid Lindgren Memorial Award winners
1989 establishments in the Israeli Civil Administration area
Organizations established in 1989